Rice Thins are a popular brand name of crackers made by Nabisco (Christie in Canada).

A spin-off of Wheat Thins,  Rice thins come in these flavours:

Original
Multigrain
Herb and Garlic
Bruschetta
Cheddar
Sesame
Sweet and Salty

Rice Thins are "Baked, not fried".

See also

Wheat Thins
Vegetable Thins
Nabisco

External links
 Kraft Canada's Rice thins page

Brand name crackers
Nabisco brands
Mondelez International brands